Evan Worrell (born September 26, 1979) is an American politician serving as a member of the West Virginia House of Delegates from the 23rd district.

Early life and education
Evan Worrell was born in Myrtle Beach, South Carolina to parents Jay and Cheryl Worrell. He earned a Bachelor of Arts degree from Marshall University.

Career
On November 6, 2018, Worrell was elected to the West Virginia House of Delegates, where he represented the 18th district, starting December 1, 2018. In the 2022 general election, Worrell was elected to represent the 23rd district. Worrell is a Republican.

Personal life
Worrell lives in Barboursville, West Virginia. Worrell and his wife, Jennifer, have six children. Worrell is a Baptist.

References

Living people
1979 births
Baptists from West Virginia
People from Myrtle Beach, South Carolina
People from Barboursville, West Virginia
Marshall University alumni
Republican Party members of the West Virginia House of Delegates
21st-century American politicians
Baptists from South Carolina